Mohammad Abu-Libdeh is a Jordanian taekwondo practitioner. At the 2012 Summer Olympics, he competed in the Men's 68 kg competition, reaching the quarterfinals.

References

Jordanian male taekwondo practitioners
Living people
Olympic taekwondo practitioners of Jordan
Taekwondo practitioners at the 2012 Summer Olympics
Taekwondo practitioners at the 2006 Asian Games
Taekwondo practitioners at the 2010 Asian Games
Year of birth missing (living people)
Asian Games competitors for Jordan
21st-century Jordanian people